Andrejs Klementjevs (born 7 September 1973, in Riga) is a Latvian politician of Russian origin. He is a member of  Harmony and a deputy of the 11th Saeima.

Education 

2009–2011
University of Latvia, Faculty of Economics and Management, master's degree programme in Public Administration, master's degree in social sciences

1998
Graduated from the Riga Aviation University, bachelor's degree in economics

Work experience 

2011
Member of the 11th Saeima, Deputy Speaker of the Saeima 
Member of the Social Affairs and Employment Matters Committee; member of the Administrative Committee
Specialised in social issues, health protection, employment legislation, and national security

2010–2011
Member of the 10th Saeima, Deputy Speaker of the Saeima 
Member of the Social Affairs and Employment Matters Committee; member of the Administrative Committee

2006–2010
Member of the 9th Saeima, Deputy Secretary of the Saeima  
Member of the Social Affairs and Employment Matters Committee; member of the National Security Committee
Specialised in social issues, health protection, employment legislation, and national security

2002–2006
Member of the 8th Saeima

1998–2002
Member of the 7th Saeima

1994–1998
Inspector (police lieutenant) at the Criminal Police Unit of the Ministry of the Interior

in 1992	Inspector at the Social Security Department of the Executive Board of the Latgale District of the Riga City Council

Marital status 
Married, two sons

References

External links
Central Election Commission of Latvia profile 
LR SAEIMA

1973 births
Riga Aviation University alumni
Living people
Politicians from Riga
Latvian people of Russian descent
Equal Rights (Latvia) politicians
National Harmony Party politicians
Social Democratic Party "Harmony" politicians
Deputies of the 7th Saeima
Deputies of the 8th Saeima
Deputies of the 9th Saeima
Deputies of the 10th Saeima
Deputies of the 11th Saeima
Deputies of the 12th Saeima
Deputies of the 13th Saeima